Celta de Vigo contested La Liga, Copa del Rey, the UEFA Cup and the UEFA Intertoto Cup. The season saw Celta win their first ever trophy, winning the Intertoto Cup, qualifying for the UEFA Cup in the process. Celta also reached the final of the Copa del Rey, where Real Zaragoza came out on top.

Squad

Transfers

Left club during season

La Liga

League table

Results by round

Matches

Copa del Rey

Quarterfinals

Semifinals

Final

UEFA Intertoto Cup

Quarterfinals

Semifinals

Finals

UEFA Cup

1st round

2nd round

Round of 32

Round of 16

Quarter-finals

Statistics

Players statistics

References

External links
   FootballSquads - Celta Vigo 2000/2001

RC Celta de Vigo seasons
Celta